Ismail Ahmedov (Azerbaijani: İsmayıl Əhmədov; 1907–1986) is 10th Mufti of the Religious Council of the Caucasus.

Personal life 
Ismail Akhmedov was born on November 27, 1907, in Shaki. In 1916-1918, he studied at the Shaki elementary school, then at the city school and in 1923-1930 he studied at the madrasa. He married in 1936.

Career 
On June 23, 1941, he was drafted into the army from the Nukha military commissariat for the World War II. He was awarded the medal "For the Defence of Stalingrad" and the medal "For Military Merit".

From 1945 to 1967 he worked as a hairdresser in the Nukha consumer services complex then moved to Baku and worked as a mullah in the Haji Azhdarbey mosque (Blue mosque) for almost two years.

In May 1969, Haji Ismail Ahmedov was elected deputy of the chairman (mufti) of the Caucasus Muslims Board. The new mufti, who did not have a higher religious education was known for his moderation and loyalty to the state. He was not very eager to preach, but thanks to his pleasant attitude he was able to win the sympathy of the Sunni believers.

In 1970 and 1973 mufti Ismail Ahmedov visited Mecca. He traveled to a number of foreign countries and participated in many high Muslim meetings and peace conferences.

Death and legacy 
He died on February 18, 1986, at the age of 78 in Baku. After his death, the position remained vacant until 1989. An ode called Ramadan, which he wrote in 1932, was published after his death.

See also 

 Religious Council of the Caucasus
 Salman Musaev

References 

Muftis of the Religious Council of the Caucasus
Muslim religious workers
Muftis
20th-century religious leaders
1907 births
1986 deaths